Pasiphila charybdis is a species of moth in the family Geometridae. It is endemic to New Zealand.

Taxonomy 
This species was first described by Arthur Gardiner Butler in 1879 and named Helastia charybdis using specimens collected by F. W. Hutton in Dunedin. In 1879, thinking he was describing a new species, Butler also named this species Helastia calida. George Hudson, also thinking he was describing a new species, named it Chloroclystis antarctica in 1898. In 1917 Meyrick placed this species within the genus Chloroclystis and synonymised Helastia calida with it. Hudson discussed Chloroclystis charybdis in his 1928 book The butterflies and moths of New Zealand but said he was unacquainted with the species. In 1971 John S. Dugdale placed this species in the genus Pasiphila. Dugdale confirmed this placement in 1988 and synonymised C. antarctica with P. charydbis. The male holotype specimen is held at the Natural History Museum, London.

Description 

Hudson described the larvae of this species as follows:

Butler described the adults of this species as follows:

When discussing this species Dugdale stated:

Habitat and hosts 
The larval hosts of this species are plants in the genus Veronica. Larvae have been successfully raised on Hebe

Life cycle
The pupa of this species can be found enfolded with silk between two leaves of its larval host. The adults of this species are on the wing from December.

References

Moths described in 1879
charybdis
Moths of New Zealand
Endemic fauna of New Zealand
Taxa named by Arthur Gardiner Butler
Endemic moths of New Zealand